, also known as Mechanical Boy Dotakon and Robot boy Dotakon, is a humorous manga written by Hosuke Fukuchi that began running in the magazine Manga Sunday in 1968 and that was later adapted into an anime television series consisting of 28 episodes, which was directed by Takeshi Shirato and first broadcast on Fuji TV in 1981.

References

External links 
 

1968 manga
1981 anime television series debuts
Fuji TV original programming
Comedy anime and manga
Jitsugyo no Nihon Sha manga